Nellithope is a village in the Papanasam taluk of Thanjavur district, Tamil Nadu, India.

Demographics 

As per the 2001 census, Nellithope had a total population of 1159 with 784 males and 775 females. The sex ratio was 989. The literacy rate was 63.02.

References 

 

Villages in Thanjavur district